The R44 is a provincial route in Western Cape, South Africa that connects Piketberg with Kleinmond via Wellington, Stellenbosch and Somerset West. The coastal section between Kleinmond and Gordon's Bay is a very scenic ocean drive. The section between Gordon's Bay and Stellenbosch via Somerset West is a dual carriageway. The R44 is co-signed with the R46 between Gouda and Hermon in the Berg River valley.

References

External links
 Routes Travel Info

44

Provincial routes in South Africa